Gianluca Pegolo (born 25 March 1981) is an Italian professional footballer who plays as a goalkeeper for Serie A side Sassuolo.

Career

Early career
Pegolo was born in Bassano del Grappa. He joined Genoa on 6 July 2007 on free transfer. He left for Mantova on 31 August 2007 and then another Serie B club Parma in August 2008, joining Julio César de León and Alessandro Lucarelli. Pegolo was the backup keeper of Nicola Pavarini.

Siena
On 29 June 2009, Pegolo joined Siena for €1 million. On the same day Genoa also signed Houssine Kharja for €6.5 million. Siena also signed the remain 50% registration rights of Manuel Coppola on 26 June for another €1.5 million. He was the backup keeper of Ferdinando Coppola (Željko Brkić in 2011–12 season)

References

External links
 

1981 births
Living people
Italian footballers
Association football goalkeepers
Italy under-21 international footballers
Italy youth international footballers
U.S. Fiorenzuola 1922 S.S. players
Hellas Verona F.C. players
Genoa C.F.C. players
Mantova 1911 players
Parma Calcio 1913 players
A.C.N. Siena 1904 players
U.S. Sassuolo Calcio players
Serie A players
Serie B players
Mediterranean Games silver medalists for Italy
Mediterranean Games medalists in football
Competitors at the 2001 Mediterranean Games